Ludovico Jacobilli ("Ludovicus Jacobillus" in Latin) was an Italian hagiographer and historian, a priest at Foligno. Jacobilli was born in Rome in 1598 into an illustrious family of Foligno and died in 1664. His work was mainly concerned with the saints and cities of Umbria.

In 1662 he donated over 5,000 books from his personal library to the Roman Catholic Diocese of Foligno to enhance the seminary library there. When he died, more than 3,500 books were added to that number. Today the library still bears his name.

Works

References

External links
 

1598 births
1664 deaths
Christian hagiographers
17th-century Italian Roman Catholic priests
17th-century Italian historians